Olga Abramova (born 15 September 1988) is a Russian (until 2012) and Ukrainian (since 2012) biathlete. Having little success in the Russian team, she changed her citizenship to Ukrainian in 2012. She made her World Cup debut at the 2013–14 season in Antholz, Italy and went on to become a regular member of the Ukrainian team. On 10 January 2016 she failed a drug test when meldonium was found in her doping test. Meldonium became illegal to use on 1 January 2016.

Performances

World Cup

Podiums

Positions

References

External links
 Profile on biathlon.com.ua
 

1988 births
Living people
Russian female biathletes
Ukrainian female biathletes
Russian emigrants to Ukraine
People from Baryshsky District
Ukrainian sportspeople in doping cases
Doping cases in biathlon
Naturalized citizens of Ukraine
Sportspeople from Ulyanovsk Oblast